Beckley Feed and Hardware Company was a historic commercial building located in Beckley, Raleigh County, West Virginia. The original section was built in 1935 and expanded in 1951.  The original section was a two-story building constructed of glazed ceramic block.  The 1951 wing was one story in height with a brick facade and a wall of windows.

It was listed on the National Register of Historic Places in 2001.

It was demolished in 2013 and replaced with a McDonald's restaurant the following year.

References

Commercial buildings on the National Register of Historic Places in West Virginia
Commercial buildings completed in 1935
Buildings and structures in Raleigh County, West Virginia
Hardware stores of the United States
National Register of Historic Places in Raleigh County, West Virginia